The SFCA Lignel 16 was a French trainer aircraft built in the early 1940s.

Specifications

References

SFCA aircraft
Trainer aircraft
Single-engined tractor aircraft
Low-wing aircraft
Aircraft first flown in 1942